Acanthoideae is a subfamily of plants in the family Acanthaceae.

Tribes and genera
Wikispecies lists the following genera in six tribes:

Acantheae

 Acanthopsis
 Acanthus
 Achyrocalyx
 Aphelandra
 Blepharis
 Crossandra 
 Crossandrella
 Cynarospermum
 Cyphacanthus
 Encephalosphaera
 Geissomeria
 Holographis
 Neriacanthus
 Orophochilus 
 Rhombochlamys
 Salpixantha
 Sclerochiton
 Stenandrium
 Streptosiphon
 Strobilacanthus 
 Xantheranthemum

Andrographideae

 Andrographis
 Cystacanthus
 Diotacanthus
 Graphandra
 Gymnostachyum
 Haplanthodes
 Indoneesiella
 Phlogacanthus

Barlerieae

 Acanthostelma
 Acanthura
 Barleria
 Barleriola
 Borneacanthus
 Boutonia
 Chroesthes
 Crabbea
 Golaea
 Hulemacanthus
 Lasiocladus
 Lepidagathis
 Lophostachys

Justicieae

 Afrofittonia
 Ambongia
 Ancistranthus
 Angkalanthus
 Anisacanthus
 Anisotes
 Anthacanthus
 Aphanosperma
 Ascotheca
 Asystasia
 Ballochia
 Brachystephanus
 Calycacanthus
 Carlowrightia
 Celerina
 Centrilla
 Cephalacanthus
 Chalarothyrsus
 Chamaeranthemum
 Chileranthemum
 Chlamydocardia
 Chlamydostachya
 Chorisochora
 Clinacanthus
 Clistax
 Codonacanthus
 Conocalyx
 Cosmianthemum
 Cyclacanthus
 Cylindrosolenium
 Danguya
 Dasytropis
 Dichazothece
 Dicladanthera
 Dicliptera
 Ecbolium
 Filetia
 Fittonia
 Forcipella
 Glossocheilus
 Graptophyllum
 Gypsacanthus
 Harpochilus
 Henrya
 Herpetacanthus
 Hoverdenia
 Hypoestes
 Ichtyostoma
 Isoglossa
 Jadunia
 Juruasia
 Justicia
 Kalbreyeriella
 Kudoacanthus
 Linariantha
 Mackaya
 Marcania
 Megalochlamys
 Megalostoma
 Megaskepasma
 Melittacanthus
 Metarungia
 Mexacanthus
 Mirandea
 Monechma
 Monothecium
 Odontonema
 Oplonia
 Oreacanthus
 Pachystachys
 Pelecostemon
 Peristrophe
 Phialacanthus
 Podorungia
 Poikilacanthus
 Populina
 Pranceacanthus
 Pseuderanthemum
 Pseudodicliptera
 Psilanthele
 Ptyssiglottis
 Pulchranthus
 Razisea
 Rhinacanthus
 Ritonia
 Rungia
 Ruspolia
 Ruttya
 Samuelssonia
 Sapphoa
 Schaueria
 Sebastiano-Schaueria
 Spathacanthus
 Sphinctacanthus
 Stenostephanus
 Streblacanthus
 Tessmanniacanthus
 Tetramerium
 Thyrsacanthus
 Thysanostigma
 Trichaulax
 Trichocalyx
 Xerothamnella
 Yeatesia

Ruellieae

 Acanthopale
 Aechmanthera
 Apassalus
 Benoicanthus
 Bravaisia
 Brillantaisia
 Brunoniella
 Calacanthus
 Clarkeasia
 Dinteracanthus
 Dischistocalyx
 Duosperma
 Dyschoriste
 Echinacanthus
 Epiclastopelma
 Eranthemum
 Eremomastax
 Hemigraphis
 Heteradelphia
 Hygrophila
 Ionacanthus
 Kosmosiphon
 Leptosiphonium
 Louteridium
 Lychniothyrsus
 Mellera
 Mimulopsis
 Pararuellia
 Petalidium
 Phaulopsis
 Physacanthus
 Pseudoruellia
 Ruellia
 Ruelliopsis
 Sanchezia
 Satanocrater
 Sautiera
 Spirostigma
 Stenosiphonium
 Stenothyrsus
 Strobilanthes
 Strobilanthopsis
 Suessenguthia
 Trichanthera
 Trichosanchezia
 Zygoruellia

Whitfieldieae

 Camarotea
 Chlamydacanthus
 Forcipella
 Lankesteria
 Leandriella
 Theileamea
 Vindasia
 Whitfieldia

References

External links
 
 

Acanthaceae
Asterid subfamilies